Jacques Louvigny (1884–1951) was a French stage and film actor.

Selected filmography
 Delphine (1931)
 On purge bébé (1931)
 Fanfare of Love (1935)
 The Lover of Madame Vidal (1936)
 Hôtel du Nord (1938)
 Mollenard (1938)
 Thunder Over Paris (1940)
 At Your Command, Madame (1942)
 Frederica (1942)
 I Am with You (1943)
 Madly in Love (1943)
 The Island of Love (1944)
 My First Love (1945)
 Not So Stupid (1946)
 Gringalet (1946)
 Pastoral Symphony (1946)
 Song of the Clouds (1946)
 The Heart on the Sleeve (1948)
 To the Eyes of Memory (1948)
 All Roads Lead to Rome (1949)

References

Bibliography
 Hayward, Susan. Simone Signoret: The Star as Cultural Sign. Continuum, 2004.

External links

1884 births
1951 deaths
French male film actors
French male stage actors
Male actors from Bordeaux